The Waggonbau Görlitz Corporation (Görlitz Rolling Stock Corporation) has built locomotives and rolling stock since 1849. They are best known for the double-deck rail cars that have been in production since 1935 in Görlitz, Germany. The Görlitz plants have been sold to Bombardier Transportation in 1998 making them available under the Bombardier Double-deck Coach brand (not to be confused with the North-American Bombardier BiLevel Coaches). Since 2021 belongs to Alstom.

History 
The origins go back to the saddle-maker Johann Christoph Lüders to open his workshop on June 5, 1828, in Görlitz at the Obermarkt (Upper Market). A year later in April 1829 he moved to the Langengasse (Longmen Alley) starting to build coaches. The works grew so that he moved to Demianiplatz (Demiani Square). The same year, a public tender from Görlitz that asked for two rail cars to be built for the forest works in the Görlitzer Heide (Görlitz Heath) was won by Johann Christoph Lüders and Conrad Schiedt on October 19, 1849. Conrad Schiedt owned a metal works shop in the Büttnergasse (Cooper Alley) producing the iron parts required for the otherwise wooden rail coaches. Lüders moved the rolling stock manufactory to the Brunnenstrasse (Well Street) the same year.

The rolling stock works continued to flourish during rail transport expansion in Germany and the German Customs Union. Already in 1852, he delivered 81 rail cars and by the end of the year the factory employed 205 men from nine trades. He bought a number of buildings at Well Street and he established a factory with steam hammers in 1853 at the site – the beginning of industrial production. The number of employees grew to 500 in 1862. The rail car deliveries grew to 300 in 1856 and 426 in 1869 including military equipment. In 1869 Lüders agreed to sell the factories to the Berlin merchant J. Mamroth for 600,000 thaler.

The new owner went to reorganize the works into a stock corporation to allow for further expansion.  The initial public offering on February 3, 1869, with an initial size of 800,000 was overrun with a 2,000,000-thaler signing for shares by February 10. On May 26, the Lüders factories were bought by the stock corporation that registered on June 21, 1869. Lüders was offered a position of technical director but he denied – the first director was to be Heinrich August Samann. In 1872, the company built 2,000 rail cars (mostly baggage cars and freight cars), employing 1,222 workers. Due to rising costs for raw material, the first dividend payout was not before 1875.

In 1921, the Waggonfabrik Görlitz (Görlitz Rolling Stock Factory) merged with the Görlitzer Maschinenbau AG (Görlitz Engineering Corporation) and the Cottbuser Maschinenbau-Anstalt und Eisengießerei AG (Cottbus Engineering and Iron Foundry Corporation) to the WUMAG - Waggon- und Maschinenbau Aktiengesellschaft Görlitz (Görlitz Rolling Stock and Engineering Corporation). Due to financial troubles as many as eight corporations founded the EISLIG (Eisenbahn-Liefergemeinschaft GmbH - Railway Supply Union Ltd) the same year but the WUMAG left in 1925 – the union included not only railway factories but many other products such that the cooperation did not pay out. However, during that time was the presentation of the Drehgestell Bauart Görlitz (Bogie Class Görlitz) that came to be a market success – and they are still in production.

In 1935, the first double-decker coaches were built for the Lübeck-Büchen Railway Company there were to connect Hamburg.

In Nazi Germany, the factories were reorganized for the military buildup. In war time, the number of German workers dropped from 2322 to 1478 while the number of forced workers grew to 1974 from a nearby concentration camp. After the war, the Soviet occupants ordered the disassembly of the factories for war reparations. During that time, a great fire on August 7/8, 1945 destroyed most of the remaining rolling stock factory. The remains of Factory I (Werk I) were handed over to German administration on September 10, 1945, the Factory II (Werk II) on January 25, 1946.

The German administration began to rebuild the factories. The former management had fled to the west so that the new directors would be Otto Schuhknecht and Willi Gerlach. Due to reconstruction requirements a number of orders came from the Deutsche Reichsbahn so that by December 1945 the factories had 242 workers already and by the end of 1946 there were 1500 employees at the factories. In that the time the engineering works were cut off into a new WUMAG Engineering Corporation to carry on the name while the rail car construction was put under a new name VEB Waggonbau Görlitz (Görlitz Rolling Stock State Corporation). This would be included in the LOWA group (Lokomotiv- und Waggonbau - locomotive and rail car construction) in 1948.

The company started to produce a wide range of products - and not only rail cars. The number of employees rose to 5754 by the end of 1950.  The company became a major supplier of railway companies in the Eastern Bloc doubling the turnover between 1970 and 1983 to 294.5 million Mark.  Although bogie production was moved to Vetschau, the company had a high demand for workers such that Polish foreign workers were employed since 1988. At the end of 1988, the numbers showed 3576 German workers along with 240 Polish workers producing 337 rail cars including 115 double-deck coaches.

With the German reunification the company was reorganized - the old VEB state corporations were subject to privatization and the Görlitz factories became owned by Waggonbau Görlitz GmbH (Görlitz Rolling Stock Ltd) as of May 1, 1990 being a subsidiary of DWA (Deutsche Waggonbau Aktiengesellschaft - German Rolling Stock Joint Stock Corporation). The DWA would later rename the Görlitz rolling stock facilities into DWA Werk Görlitz (DWA Factories Görlitz) and it would be rebuilt into a competence center for double-deck coaches and ICE-T coaches. On July 5, 1995 the 5000. double-deck coach was delivered to German national railways (Deutsche Bahn after reunification). Still being state owned the DWA were finally sold to the private equity Advent International in March 1996.

On August 29, 1996, the Deutsche Bahn contracted the delivery of 58 double-deck coaches and 192 rail coaches with an option for another 350 coaches. On the November 28, 1996, a new construction building (7000 square meters) was opened at Factory II and in 1997 the Factory I site was closed down. At the end of 1996, the numbers showed 1200 employees and 105 apprentices. Since the end of 1997 the new owner would run negotiations with Bombardier Transportation which led to the integration of DWA into Bombardier on February 2, 1998. On April 3, 1998, the first ICE-T was delivered and beginning 1998/1999 the first DBAG Class 445 trains were delivered, also known as Bombardier Double-deck Electrical Multiple Units Intercity trains.

The Deutsche Bahn would continue to order delivery of double-deck coaches from its contract in 1996. Further double-deck coaches were developed for Israel and Denmark. Some more double-deck coaches were sold to Luxembourg and the Netherlands, and finally in 2008 the first double-deck cars for Poland were built (after a 20 years and the fall of the Eastern Bloc). Reorganizations had it that some factories were closed down but other buildings were rebuilt. By the end of 2008 the Görlitz rolling stock facilities had 1212 employees and 49 apprentices.

On January 5, 2009, the Deutsche Bahn would contract Bombardier on a delivery of 800 double-deck coaches of the new 2010 Generation, and by the end of 2010 another contract for 135 Intercity double-deck EMUs was achieved. The new double-deck rail cars were able to win other public tenders throughout Europe such that production capacity will fully run up to 2014.

Product Range 
Following is an excerpt of rail cars built at Görlitz:

References

External links 

 Homepage at Bombardier Transportation
 Information on the Double-deck rail cars

Rolling stock manufacturers of Germany